Ibrahim Al-Asiri Yahya (born 26 October 1965) is a Saudi Arabian middle-distance runner. He competed in the men's 3000 metres steeplechase at the 1996 Summer Olympics.

References

1965 births
Living people
Athletes (track and field) at the 1996 Summer Olympics
Saudi Arabian male middle-distance runners
Saudi Arabian male steeplechase runners
Olympic athletes of Saudi Arabia
Place of birth missing (living people)